The 1990 Prize of Moscow News was the 24th and final edition of an international figure skating competition organized in Moscow, Soviet Union. It was held in late 1990. Medals were awarded in the disciplines of men's singles, ladies' singles, pair skating and ice dancing. Only the men's medalists are known.

Men

Ladies

Pairs

Ice dancing

1990 in figure skating
Prize of Moscow News